Ibrahim Danlad (born 2 December 2002) is a Ghanaian professional footballer who plays as a goalkeeper for Berekum Chelsea, on loan from Asante Kotoko of the Ghana Premier League, and for the Ghana U23.

Club career
Born in Accra, Danlad joined Asante Kotoko in 2016–17 season. In December 2019, Danlad joined Ghana Premier League club Berekum Chelsea for the rest of the 2019–20 season.

International career
Danlad has played for Ghana at all levels, having represented the nation at under-17 to the senior national team (Black Stars) level.

In 2017, he was the first choice goalkeeper for the Ghana squad which participated at the 2017 FIFA U-17 World Cup in India, playing all the matches.

Honours 
Asante Kotoko
 Ghana Premier League: 2021–22

Ghana U20
 Africa U-20 Cup of Nations: 2021
 WAFU Zone B U-20 Tournament: 2020

Individual
 Golden Glove WAFU Zone B U-20 Tournament: 2020
 Golden Glove Africa U-20 Cup of Nations: 2021
 IFFHS CAF Youth Team of the Year: 2020
 Ghana Football Awards Goalkeeper of the year: 2021

References

External links

2002 births
Living people
Ghanaian footballers
Association football goalkeepers
Ghana Premier League players
Asante Kotoko S.C. players
Berekum Chelsea F.C. players
Footballers from Accra
Ghana youth international footballers
Ghana under-20 international footballers
21st-century Ghanaian people
2022 FIFA World Cup players
Ghana A' international footballers
2022 African Nations Championship players